The Nieuport 17bis C.1 (or Nieuport XVIIbis C.1 in contemporary sources) was a World War I French single-seat sesquiplane fighter that was produced under licence in the United Kingdom in small numbers for the Royal Naval Air Service.

Development 

The Nieuport 17bis designation was initially used by Nieuport for a Nieuport 11 variant that had been retrofitted with the wings and side fairings from a Nieuport 17, however this type was not produced in any numbers and the designation was reused.

The Nieuport 17bis was the first of the vee strut scouts to feature a fully streamlined fuselage, with longitudinal stringers to fair out the shape. Other than the changes to the fuselage, minimal alterations were made, and unlike the later 24, 24bis and 27, the flying surfaces remained the same as used on the 17, as was much of the internal structure. Unlike the 17, or any of the other Vee strutters, it had the Vickers Machine Gun offset to the port (left) side of the centerline. Due to shortages of Le Rhône rotaries, they were fitted with the  Clerget 9B rotary instead of the  lighter  Le Rhône 9J used in most of the other Nieuport single seat scouts. A few examples were fitted with the lower powered  Clerget 9Z. As a result of the Clerget's slightly greater diameter, the cowling was ballooned out slightly to provide clearance.

The majority of Nieuport 17bis were operated by 6 (Naval) Squadron, who tested them against a Sopwith Triplane and a Sopwith Camel. It was found to have similar manoeuvrability to the Triplane and have a higher dive speed, but was slightly slower at altitude and had heavier controls. Climb rates varied, and in the first test the 17bis outclimbed the Triplane by a significant margin, however in the second test the times to altitude were identical between the two types. The Camel was marginally faster at sea level but had a lower rate of climb while the speed advantage gradually disappeared with altitude. Initial reports were impressive, but the Clerget engines lost power quickly between overhauls, and the problem was worse with the British built engines. Many pilots tried to have French-built engines in their aircraft. Some aircraft were also delivered to units with incorrect propellers, which also hampered performance.

Triplane
At least one 17bis was built as a triplane in the same manner as the Nieuport 17 triplanes, with the wings staggered with the middle wing furthest forward, and the lowest wing furthest aft. Flight testing discovered that it was longitudinally unstable but handled well otherwise, but the concept was not pursued further.

Nieuport 23bis
The Nieuport 23bis was a later but in many ways a similar development to the 17bis and was the result of the RFC's desperation to get as many aircraft as possible into front line service, but only 17 were produced and all went to the RFC. It combined the flying surfaces including the tail of the 23 with the fuselage of the 24bis, and was fitted with other Nieuport 23 parts, such as an earlier form of cowling. Unlike the 17bis, it retained the Le Rhône normally used by Nieuport scouts.

Distinguishing features
The 17, 17bis, 23 and 23bis flying surfaces had the front spar positioned further forward than on the later types. Aside from the lack of a plywood leading edge to the wing, the key identifying feature was the rake of the forward cabane struts connecting the top wing to the fuselage. On the 17, 17bis, 21, 23 and 23bis, the cabane struts were angled forward from the fuselage, while on the 24, 24bis, 25 and 27, they were angled aft. Both the 17bis and the 23bis used the square ailerons, rather than the rounded ailerons used on production versions of the later types.

Operational history 
Aside from one example being flown by Charles Nungesser and marked with his personal serial number N1895, the Nieuport 17bis saw little service with the French Aéronautique Militaire.

The Royal Naval Air Service (RNAS) was the primary operator of the Nieuport 17bis, with 6 (Naval) Squadron being the only unit wholly equipped with the type. It primarily replaced the obsolete Nieuport 10 and the Nieuport 11 and would in turn be replaced by the Sopwith Camel. The RNAS received 82 examples, of which 32 were from Nieuport (including 1 triplane) and 50 from Nieuport & General Aircraft who built them under licence in the UK. The British-built examples were delivered so slowly that the type had been declared obsolete before most were even delivered and only 4 were known to have been used operationally. As a consequence, most were never removed from their crates, and were scrapped without having been flown. The initial order of 50 had been reduced from 100, and an additional order of 100 from Nieuport & General was cancelled outright. After having been withdrawn from front line duties beginning in June 1917, some were used for training in the UK, where they were flown unarmed. Those that were built in France were silver doped, while those built in the UK were camouflaged.

The Royal Flying Corps never operated the 17bis, however it did receive 17 of the similar Nieuport 23bis that had been misidentified until recently.

Variants
Nieuport 17bis -  Clerget 9B rotary
Experimental variant with oversized spinner.
Nieuport 17bis Triplane -  Clerget 9B rotary
Nieuport 23bis -  Le Rhône 9J rotary

Operators 
 
Royal Naval Air Service (RNAS) - Nieuport 17bis only.
6 (Naval) Squadron
9 (Naval) Squadron 2 examples used while the unit was forming in Feb 1917.
11 (Naval) Squadron used several examples while acting as a pilot pool and operational training unit for 6 Squadron.
Royal Flying Corps (RFC) - Nieuport 23bis only.
No. 14 Squadron RFC
No. 29 Squadron RFC
No. 111 Squadron RFC
No. 113 Squadron RFC

Aéronautique Militaire - operated a small number of the 17bis, mainly for trials and test purposes.

Specifications (Nieuport 17bis)

See also

References

Notes

Citations

Bibliography

External links

 017b
1910s French fighter aircraft
Military aircraft of World War I
Sesquiplanes
Single-engined tractor aircraft
Rotary-engined aircraft
Aircraft first flown in 1917